A Revenue Village is a small administrative region in India, a village with defined borders. One revenue village may contain many hamlets. Each revenue village is headed by a Village Administrative Officer (VAO).

History
The advent of the concept revenue village dates back to the system of land reform introduced by Raja Todar Mal, minister of revenue in the court of Emperor Akbar. The essence of the reform was the assessment of the land revenue according to the extent of cultivation, the nature of the soil and the quality of the crops. In the 18th century, the Marathas were to excel in the preparation of area maps of revenue villages for the aid of native rulers. Though at times the system broke down was deployed unevenly within the Mughal Empire, it was the underlying basis of the later day revenue system introduced in British Indian administration.

The revenue village was and is still designed as the lowest administrative unit in the settlement hierarchy. It was designed to improve revenue collection mechanism and regulate the process and not for village planning and development.

References

Government finances in India
Local government in India